Admiral Sir Edward Hughes (c. 17201794) was a Royal Navy officer who commanded the East Indies Station.

Naval career
Hughes joined the Royal Navy in 1735, and four years later, was present at the capture of Portobelo, Panama. In 1740, he was promoted to lieutenant and served in the Cartagena expedition of 1741, and at the indecisive Battle of Toulon in 1744. In HMS Warwick, he participated in the action against the Glorioso, but without proper support from the Lark (which was sailing with the Warwick), the enemy escaped. The commander of the Lark was subsequently tried and condemned for his conduct, and Hughes received the vacated command. Captain Hughes was with Edward Boscawen at Louisburg and with Charles Saunders at Quebec.

He was in continual employment during the peace, and as commodore, commanded the East Indies Station from 1773 to 1777.
Before long, he returned to the East Indies Station as a rear-admiral, with an overwhelming naval force. On his outward voyage, he took Gorée from the French, and he was called upon to conduct only minor operations for the next two years, as the enemy could not muster any force fit to meet the powerful squadron Hughes had brought from the Channel.

With Spain and Great Britain at war during the American Revolutionary War, Spanish authorities in Chile received a warning that Hughes was heading to Chilean coasts for an imminent attack. This attack did however never happen. 
In 1782, at the reopening of hostilities in the East Indies, he stormed Trincomalee a few days before the squadron of Suffren arrived in the neighbourhood. For the next year, these Indian waters were the scene of one of the most famous of naval campaigns. Suffren was perhaps the ablest naval commander that France ever produced, but his subordinates were factious and unskilful; Hughes on the other hand, whose ability was that born of long experience rather than genius, was well supported. No fewer than five fiercely contested general actions were fought by the two fleets, neither of them gaining a decisive advantage. In the end, Hughes held his ground.

After the peace, he returned to England, and, though further promotions came to him, he never again hoisted his flag. He had accumulated considerable wealth during his Indian service, which for the most part he spent in unostentatious charity. He died at his seat of Luxborough in Essex in 1794.

His second wife Ruth died in 1800. Hughes' fortune went to Edward Hughes Ball Hughes (c. 1798 – 1863), her grandson by a previous marriage, who became the dandy and wastrel known as "The Golden Ball".

Tribute
The British East India Company ship the Sir Edward Hughes launched in 1784, was named after him.

References

External links
 

|-

1720 births
1794 deaths
Royal Navy admirals
British military personnel of the Second Anglo-Mysore War
Knights of the Bath
Royal Navy personnel of the American Revolutionary War
British military personnel of the Fourth Anglo-Dutch War#